Vikings invaded the territory around Dublin in the 9th century, establishing the Norse Kingdom of Dublin, the earliest and longest-lasting Norse kingdom in Ireland. Its territory corresponded to most of present-day County Dublin. The Norse referred to the kingdom as Dyflin, which is derived . The first reference to the Vikings comes from the Annals of Ulster and the first entry for 841 AD reads: "Pagans still on Lough Neagh". It is from this date onward that historians get references to ship fortresses or longphorts being established in Ireland. It may be safe to assume that the Vikings first over-wintered in 840–841 AD. The actual location of the longphort of Dublin is still a hotly debated issue. Norse rulers of Dublin were often co-kings, and occasionally also Kings of Jórvík in what is now Yorkshire. Under their rule, Dublin became the biggest slave port in Western Europe.

Over time, the settlers in Dublin became increasingly Gaelicized. They began to exhibit a great deal of Gaelic and Norse cultural syncretism, and are often referred to as Norse-Gaels.

The extent of the kingdom varied, but in peaceful times it extended roughly as far as Wicklow in the south, Glen Ding near Blessington, Leixlip west of Dublin, and Skerries, Dublin to the north. The Fingal area north of Dublin was named after the Norse who lived there.

In 988, Máel Sechnaill mac Domnaill led the initial Gaelic conquest of Dublin. As a result, the founding of Dublin is counted by some from the year 988, although a village had existed on the site of Dublin nearly a thousand years earlier.

Coins were minted in Dublin by about 995, and on Mann by about 1025.

In the mid-11th century, the Kingdom of Leinster began exerting influence over Dublin. Though the last king of Dublin was killed by the Norman conquerors of Dublin in 1171, the population of the city retained their distinctiveness for some generations.

Kings of Dublin

^ Disputed * Speculative

Timeline of Kings of Dublin

See also
 Irish nobility
 The Pale
 Uí Ímair

References

Notes

Sources

 Downham, Clare, Viking Kings of Britain and Ireland: The Dynasty of Ívarr to A.D. 1014. Edinburgh. 2007.

 Forte, Angelo, Oram, Richard, & Pedersen, Frederik, Viking Empires. Cambridge University Press. 2005 .
 Hudson, Benjamin T., Viking Pirates and Christian Princes: Dynasty, Religion, and Empire in the North Atlantic. Oxford. 2005 .
 Larsen, Anne-Christine (ed.), The Vikings in Ireland. Roskilde: The Viking Ship Museum. 2001.
 Todd, James Henthorn (ed. and tr.), Cogadh Gaedhel re Gallaibh: The War of the Gaedhil with the Gaill. Longmans. 1867.
 Woolf, Alex, "Age of Sea-Kings: 900–1300", in Donald Omand (ed.), The Argyll Book. Edinburgh. 2004. pp. 94–109.

 
1171 disestablishments
States and territories established in the 850s
 
Lists of monarchs
History of County Dublin
Norwegian noble families
Norwegian noble titles
Kingdoms of medieval Ireland
Viking Age in Ireland
Kingdom of Norway (872–1397)
Former kingdoms
853 establishments
1170s disestablishments in Europe
Former kingdoms in Ireland